The Blackburn B-3 was a prototype British torpedo bomber designed and built by Blackburn Aircraft as a potential replacement for the Ripon. It was unsuccessful, with only the two prototypes being built.

Design and development
In 1930, the British Air Ministry issued Specification M.1/30 for a carrier-based torpedo bomber to replace the Ripon, to be powered by the Rolls-Royce Buzzard or Armstrong Siddeley Leopard engines.  Prototypes were ordered from Blackburn, Handley Page and Vickers. The Blackburn design was a single-bay biplane, with a fabric-covered steel tube fuselage, powered by a Buzzard engine. The prototype was flown first on 8 March 1932  and crashed in June 1933 following an engine failure.  Because it had been ordered by the Air Ministry, this machine carried an RAF serial (S1640) and was known throughout its life as the M.1/30, after the Specification.

Following relaxation of some of the specifications requirements, Blackburn constructed a second aircraft as a private venture, with a watertight metal monocoque fuselage replacing the previous steel tube fuselage, this first flying on 24 February 1933. Because it was a private venture it received and carried the Blackburn Class B civil test marking B-3 and was referred to as such, though it was also known as the M.1/30A. It performed poorly during testing, still being incapable of meeting the performance requirements of the specification even though they had been relaxed, and being too heavy for the carrier deck lifts. As none of the competitors for the specification could meet its requirements, the specification was cancelled, with no aircraft being ordered.

Specifications (M.1/30A)

See also

References

External links

 

1930s British bomber aircraft
M.1 30
Single-engined tractor aircraft
Biplanes
Aircraft first flown in 1932